Humphrey Hawksley is an English journalist and author who has been a foreign correspondent for the BBC since the early 1980s.

Education
Hawksley was educated at St Lawrence College, Ramsgate in Kent, after which he joined the Merchant Navy to work his passage to Australia.

Life and career
Humphrey Hawksley has reported on key trends, events and conflicts from all over the world.

His work as a BBC foreign correspondent has taken him to crises on every continent. He was expelled from Sri Lanka, opened the BBC’s television bureau in China, arrested in Serbia and initiated a global campaign against enslaved children in the chocolate industry. The campaign continues today.

His television documentaries include The Curse of Gold and Bitter Sweet  examining human rights abuse in global trade; Aid Under Scrutiny on the failures of international development; Old Man Atom that investigates the global nuclear industry; and Danger: Democracy at Work on the risks of bringing Western-style democracy too quickly to some societies.

Humphrey is the author of the acclaimed ‘Future History’ series Dragon Strike, Dragon Fire and The Third World War  that explores world conflict.   He has published four international thrillers, Ceremony of Innocence, Absolute Measures, Red Spirit and Security Breach, together with the non-fiction Democracy Kills: What’s so good about the Vote – a tie-in to his TV documentary on the pitfalls of the  modern-day path to democracy from dictatorship.

His work has appeared in The Guardian, The Times, Financial Times, International Herald Tribune, Yale Global and other publications.  His university lectures include Columbia, Cambridge, University College London and the London Business School. He is a regular  speaker and panellist including at Intelligence Squared and the Royal Geographical Society, and he has presented his work and moderated at many literary festivals.

Humphrey has been successfully moderating countless events Live and Online organised by The Democracy Forum UK.

Books

Non-fiction

Democracy Kills: What's So Good About Having the Vote? (2010)
Asian Waters (2018)

Fiction

Hawksley is the author of political novels aimed at raising key strategic issues in the far east before a broader audience.

Dragon Strike, co-authored with Simon Holberton (1997)
Ceremony of Innocence (1998)
Absolute Measures (1999)
Dragon Fire (2000)
Red Spirit (2001)
The Third World War (2003)
The History Book (2007, re-released as Security Breach in 2008)
Man on Ice https://www.humphreyhawksley.com/book/man-on-ice/
Man on Edge https://www.humphreyhawksley.com/book/man-on-edge/
Home Run
Friends and Enemies

References

External links
  Humphrey Hawksley's website
 Book Trailer for The History Book by Humphrey Hawksley

Living people
BBC newsreaders and journalists
People educated at St Lawrence College, Ramsgate
Year of birth missing (living people)